The Matinee Idol is a 1928 American silent comedy-drama film directed by Frank Capra, and starring Bessie Love and Johnnie Walker. It was produced and distributed by Columbia Pictures.

Prints are in the archives of the Cinémathèque Française and Cineteca di Bologna. The film has been restored. The Academy Film Archive preserved The Matinee Idol in 1997.

Plot 
Don Wilson, a famous blackface comedian, is preparing to headline a new show. Arnold Wingate, his manager, persuades him to take a weekend off in the country. When their car breaks down, they go off in search of a mechanic.

Don happens upon a ramshackle traveling theatrical stock company run by Jasper Bolivar and his daughter Ginger. One of the actors has quit, so Ginger is holding an audition. When Don asks the hopefuls in line about a garage, Ginger mistakes him for one of the applicants and chooses him as the best of a bad lot. Amused (and attracted to Ginger), he accepts the job, giving his name as "Harry Mann". Playing a dying Union soldier, Don has one line ("I love you.") and gets kissed by Ginger's character.

The show, an American Civil War melodrama, is terribly amateurish, but the audience does not know any better and applauds appreciatively. Don's friends attend the show and laugh, particularly at his hijinks. (Don repeats his line several times, forcing Ginger to kiss him over and over again.) Afterward, Ginger fires him for his bad acting.

Wingate has an idea; he signs the company for his Broadway show as a comedy act, though the Bolivars and the rest of the actors are deceived into believing their play has been appreciated. Don has Wingate stipulate that the entire cast be included, so Ginger reluctantly rehires him. He insists on a raise.

During rehearsals, Don maintains his disguise by wearing blackface. Even so, he is nearly caught out by Ginger; hurriedly putting on a costume to hide his face, Don has to invent a masquerade party as a reason, and invites her and her troupe to attend. During the party, he tries to seduce her. When she rejects him, he is pleased, certain that she has feelings for his alter-ego.

On opening night, Don has second thoughts about the humiliation the Bolivar troupe is about to face, but it is too late to do anything about it. When "Harry Mann" cannot be found, Don offers to take his place. All goes as Wingate had anticipated; the audience laughs wildly, as the confused actors continue performing. At the end, Ginger finally realizes what is going on and berates the audience, then walks out into the rain. When Don follows to console her, the rain washes away his makeup and reveals his true identity.

Ginger and her father take their production back on the road. A contrite Don shows up at the audition for a replacement actor. Though Ginger at first turns away from him, she then leads him into the tent, where they embrace.

Cast 
 Bessie Love as Ginger Bolivar
 Johnnie Walker as Don Wilson, a.k.a. "Harry Mann"
 Ernest Hilliard as Arnold Wingate
 Lionel Belmore as Jasper Bolivar
 David Mir as Eric Barrymaine

Production 
In early February 1928, Columbia Pictures announced that Bessie Love would have the female lead in the film, which had the working title of Broadway Daddies. The film was slated to begin production on February 2 with Frank Capra directing and Joe Jackson writing the continuity. Later, it was announced that Johnny Walker would co-star with Love, that Sidney D'Albrook and Lionel Belmore had been added to the cast, and that the name of the project had changed from Broadway Daddies to The Matinee Idol.

Release and rediscovery 
In France, the film was released as Bessie à Broadway, as star Bessie Love was a strong box-office draw there. It was a French-language version of the film, originally obtained by a French cinema club, that was eventually rediscovered at the Cinémathèque Française in the 1990s.

See also 
 Matinee idol
 Racism in early American film

References

External links 

 
 
 
 

1928 comedy-drama films
1928 films
American black-and-white films
1920s English-language films
American silent feature films
Blackface minstrel shows and films
Columbia Pictures films
Films directed by Frank Capra
1920s American films
Silent American comedy-drama films